Lophopus crystallinus, commonly known as the bellflower animal or crystal moss animal, is the first species ever described of the genus Lophopus, from the Lophopodidae family, and is the only member of the family that can be found in the UK.

Description
The species are colonial, and have a gelatinous outer wall. They are fan shaped when viewed with the naked eye.

Distribution
The species is widely distributed in Europe. It can be found in as many as 62 lakes and rivers throughout the UK.

Feeding
It feeds on algae. It prefers cold climate, and is tolerant of eutrophication.

Life and reproduction
The species life cycle is few months. They start dormanting in September, and reproduce by winter. They die by March. However, in spring fed pools they could live and reproduce forever. Their sexual  reproduction is quite rare, and is poorly known. They grow by budding with different kinds of zooids.

Conservation
It is listed as a priority species under the UK Biodiversity Action Plan.

References

Bibliography
 Hill S & Okamura BA Review of the ecology of Lophopus crystallinus (Plumatellida, Lophopodidae), a rare species within the UK. na ; Biologiezentrum Linz/Austria ; Denisia 16, zugleich Kataloge der OÖ.Landesmuseen Neue Serie 28 (2005), 193-201(pdf from Google Drive).

Phylactolaemata
Freshwater animals of Europe
Animals described in 1768
Taxa named by Peter Simon Pallas